Mǎshuǐ (马水) may refer to:

 Mashui, Yangchun, town in Guangdong, China
 Mashui Township (马水镇), a town of Leiyang City, Hunan.